The Kellner-Béchereau E.1 was an experimental single engine, single seat light aircraft, designed in France in the 1930s. It was a monoplane with a novel "double" wing, the rear part providing lift and lateral control as well as acting as slotted flaps.

Design and development
Louis Béchereau's career as an aircraft designer began before the First World War when he worked first for Armand Deperdussin and then Louis Bleriot. Towards the end of the war he joined Adolphe Bernard's newly founded company for a short time. In the 1930s, he set up Avions Kellner-Béchereau, a collaboration with the well known automobile coach builders Kellner. In 1936-7 they built a short series of small monoplanes exploiting one of Béchereau's patents, a full span lateral division of the wing into two sections forming a "double wing" a little like that used by Junkers but with a more equal division of area. The Kellner-Béchereau E.1 was the first of these.

The E.1 was a wooden aircraft with spruce frames and plywood covering. It was a mid-wing cantilever monoplane with straight, thick section, constant chord wings of quite high aspect ratio (8.45). The lateral division was at about 65% chord, with the rear part joined to the front with conspicuous V-shaped faired underwing hinges. In normal flight the two parts were close together and the rear sections acted both as lifting surface and, differentially, ailerons but they could also be lowered together as slotted flaps, moving rearwards as well as down to produce a slot between fore and aft parts.
The fuselage was rectangular in cross section, with a single place open cockpit at the wing trailing edge, baggage space behind and an inverted in-line  Train 4T in the nose. A straight edged tailplane was mounted on the upper fuselage longerons and carried elevators with a small cut-out for rudder movement. The latter, mounted on a very narrow fin, was rectangular and extended to the bottom of the fuselage. The rear control surfaces were fabric covered. The E.1 had a conventional undercarriage with cantilever main legs hinged on the lower longerons, rubber sprung inside the fuselage.

After flight tests in 1936, the E.1 was developed into a pair of larger and more powerful side by side seat basic trainers, the wooden Kellner-Béchereau EC.4 and the metal Kellner-Béchereau ED.5, flown in 1937.

Variants
Kellner-Béchereau E.1A wooden light aircraft powered by a 4-cylinder Train 4T inverted air-cooled four stroke piston engine developing .
Kellner-Béchereau E.C.4An enlarged E.1 powered by a 6-cylinder Train 6T delivering 
Kellner-Béchereau E.D.5Outwardly identical to the E.C.4 but constructed of Duralumin.

Specifications

References

Kellner-Béchereau aircraft
1930s French civil aircraft
Mid-wing aircraft
Single-engined tractor aircraft
Aircraft first flown in 1936